William Gaston Caperton III (born February 21, 1940) is an American politician who served as the 31st Governor of West Virginia from 1989 to 1997. He was president of the College Board, which administers the nationally recognized SAT and AP tests, from 1999 to 2012.  He is a member of the Democratic Party.

Pre-gubernatorial history
Caperton was born in Charleston, West Virginia. He attended Dexter School (Brookline, Massachusetts), Episcopal High School in Alexandria, Virginia and the University of North Carolina at Chapel Hill, where he was a member of Delta Kappa Epsilon.

After graduation he returned to Charleston to manage a family-owned insurance firm. He soon became its principal owner and, under his watch, it became the tenth largest privately owned insurance brokerage firm in the nation. Caperton owned a bank and mortgage banking firm. Caperton was elected governor in his first attempt to seek public office in 1988.

Gubernatorial history, 1988–1997

Elections

In the 1988 gubernatorial election, Caperton, initially considered a long-shot for his party's nomination, defeated a crowded primary, winning a narrow plurality over the '84 nominee and Speaker of the State House, then in the General Election, as an underdog, once more upset the Republican Party incumbent, Arch A. Moore Jr.

In the 1992 election, Caperton was challenged by State Senator Charlotte Pritt and then State Attorney General Mario Palumbo in the Democratic primary. Caperton narrowly won the primary over Pritt and the general election, defeating the Republican candidate, West Virginia Secretary of Agriculture Cleve Benedict, and Pritt, running as a write-in candidate.

Caperton was constitutionally prohibited from running for a third consecutive term in 1996. He ended up supporting the Republican nominee, former Governor Cecil Underwood, against Pritt, which led to a party split and bad feelings among some in the state party.

Financial policy
During his first term as the state's 31st governor, Caperton supported the passages of ethics, road-building, and education bills. He raised taxes in an effort to improve West Virginia's finances, thereby reducing debts exceeding $500 million and creating a $100 million surplus. Because of the reforms, Financial World magazine called the state the most improved in the nation. Critics accused Caperton of failing to keep a campaign promise not to raise taxes, but defenders claimed that the previous governor had misstated the condition of the state's finances and failed to disclose the need for tax increases.

Education policy
Publicly, Governor Caperton emphasized that education was his first priority. Caperton supported a school-building program that led to $800 million in investments for 58 new schools and 780 school renovations, directly benefiting two-thirds of West Virginia's public school students. After a brief strike by the state's public educators, Caperton raised teachers' salaries from 49th to 31st in the nation and trained more than 19,000 educators through a statewide Center for Professional Development with the goal of putting technology to its best use in West Virginia's classrooms. He encouraged the use of computers and technology in West Virginia public schools, resulting in the West Virginia Basic Skills Computer Program, which began with kindergarten and extended through sixth grade. His common refrain for "computers in every classroom" since has been expanded to include grades 7–12. In 1996, West Virginia's advances in education technology gained national recognition when Caperton received the Computerworld Smithsonian Award. Award sponsors called Caperton a "visionary" who "fundamentally changed the education system in America" by using technological innovations. Information about Caperton and his work is included in the Smithsonian's Permanent Research Collection. In January 1997, the magazine Education Week, conducted a study of the nation's education system and highlighted West Virginia for the state's use of technology in education.

Economic policy
As governor, Caperton focused his efforts on economic development, modern roads and infrastructure, prisons and jails, a clean environment, health care, and government management. West Virginia's economy improved during his eight-year tenure. Unemployment dropped from 9.8% to 6.2%, the result of creating approximately 86,000 new jobs.  As part of his efforts to promote a clean environment, on August 13, 1992, Governor Gaston Caperton announced the creation of the West Virginia Streams Restoration Program, dedicated to treating acid drainage from coal mining.

National leadership roles
Near the end of his second term, Caperton was the 1996 chair of the Democratic Governor's Association, served on the National Governor's Association executive committee, and was a member of the Intergovernmental Policy Advisory Committee on U.S. Trade. He was chairman of the Appalachian Regional Commission, Southern Regional Education Board, and the Southern Growth Policy Board. Caperton has received numerous state and national awards and special recognition, including ten honorary doctoral degrees.

Tamarack
Another product of Caperton's tenure is the Tamarack, the Best of West Virginia.  The facility is a museum, art gallery, and collection of studios for visiting artists that showcases products of West Virginia and organizes the state's "cottage industry." Tamarack is the center of an integrated distribution and marketing network for products by more than 1,200 West Virginia artists. The Rosen Group, publisher of Niche magazine, named Caperton the 1997 Humanitarian of the Year for creating a progressive market for the state's cottage industry.

Post-gubernatorial career

After completing his second term, the former governor taught at Harvard University in the spring of 1997 as a fellow at the Harvard Institute of Politics. He founded the Institute on Education and Government at Columbia University.

Caperton became President and CEO of the College Board on July 1, 1999. The New York City based College Board is a nonprofit membership association of more than 4,200 schools, colleges and other educational institutions throughout America. Its mission, as expressed by Caperton, is to prepare, inspire and connect students to college success, with a focus on excellence and equity. The College Board is best known for its SAT college admissions exam and for its Advanced Placement Program, which offers high school students access to quality, college-level course work.  Since taking the helm of the College Board, Caperton has sought to enhance the standing and expand the reach of these two programs and to launch a series of initiatives. As a result of one of these initiatives, AP courses became more available to inner city and rural students.

Caperton expresses concern about unequal educational opportunity, and he led an effort to encourage students at middle schools to go to college, particularly the least advantaged.  His efforts prompted USA Today to label him an "education crusader".  The publication also named him one of the most influential people in America in its feature, "People to Watch: 2001."

In 2004, Caperton led a successful campaign to revise the SAT when the College Board's trustees requested changes to the test. The College Board introduced a set of changes to the SAT that include a writing test, more critical reading, and advanced math.  The goal of the new SAT was to more closely reflect the coursework of the nation's high school students while maintaining what the Board describes as the test's level of rigor and excellence. The new SAT Reasoning Test was administered for the first time in March 2005.

Under Caperton's leadership, the College Board led an effort called "Don't Forget Ed!" that was designed to elevate education as an issue in the 2012 presidential campaign. As part of that effort, the College Board hosted a presidential candidate forum on October 27, 2011 called "The Future of American Education."

In 2012, Caperton wrote "The Achievable Dream: College Board Lessons on Creating Great Schools," a book that highlights specific lessons of educational success that can be replicated in schools across the country.

Caperton was reportedly among the top candidates to fill the remainder of the late Senator Robert Byrd's term. The appointment ultimately went to Carte Goodwin.

He is now the Vice Chairman for Leeds Equity Partners, a New York-based Private Equity firm focused solely on education. Caperton has worked in this capacity since January, 2013.

Personal life
William Gaston Caperton III was born in Charleston, Kanawha County. After attending Episcopal High School in Alexandria, Virginia, and the University of North Carolina, he returned to Charleston to manage a family-owned insurance firm. Caperton was elected governor in his first attempt to seek public office in 1988.

Caperton has been married three times.  Caperton and his first wife, Ella Dee Caperton (born Ella Kessel, Miss West Virginia 1964) divorced in 1989 during his first term, and she later unsuccessfully ran in the election for state treasurer. With Dee he had two boys, William Gaston Caperton, IV,  ("Gat") and John Caperton. Both sons are married and living with their own families ("Gat" in West Virginia and John in California).  Dee died in France on September 1, 2000.

His second wife was the Musical Director/ Conductor of the Wheeling Symphony Orchestra, Rachael Worby.  She and Caperton divorced in 1998.

In 2003, he married his third wife Idit Harel Caperton, an Israeli-American, MIT PhD, Harvard EdM, education technology expert, mother of three, and the Founder and CEO of MaMaMedia and Globaloria. She and Caperton divorced in 2012.

References

External links
 College Board
 Biography of William G. Caperton III
 Inaugural Address of William G. Caperton III (1989)
 Inaugural Address of William G. Caperton III (1993)
 West Virginia Democratic Legislative Council
 National Governors Association
 Education Update Article
 Forbes Article
 Apple Crisp Recipe
 

|-

|-

|-

|-

1940 births
American Episcopalians
American businesspeople in insurance
Businesspeople from Charleston, West Virginia
Caperton family of Virginia and West Virginia
Columbia University faculty
Democratic Party governors of West Virginia
Educators from West Virginia
Episcopal High School (Alexandria, Virginia) alumni
Harvard Kennedy School staff
Living people
Politicians from Charleston, West Virginia
University of North Carolina at Chapel Hill alumni
20th-century American politicians